Cieneguillas is a town in the Mexican state of Zacatecas. It is located in the centre of the state and lies within the municipality of Zacatecas.  The city has 2,200 inhabitants which makes it the second most populous settlement in the municipality, after the municipal and state capital, Zacatecas City, within whose greater urban confines Cieneguillas lies.

Prison riots

Prison riots occurred in Cieneguillas in 2019 and 2020.

References

Populated places in Zacatecas